The Fengbitou Archaeological Site is an archaeological site in Linyuan District, Kaohsiung, Taiwan.

History
The site was discovered by Japanese scholar Sueo Kaneko around 1941. In 1945, Japanese archaeologist Kiyotari Tsuboi excavated the site and presented his findings at an international conference in 1953. In 1965, Taiwanese archaeologist Jhang Guang-jhi further excavated the site. The excavation unearthed the Dapenkeng, Niouchouzih and Fengbitou cultures.

The site was designated as a national historic monument by the Ministry of the Interior in February 2000 and further designated as a national historic site in 2006.

Geology
The 9.77-hectare site is located at the slope of Fengshan Hill with a shape of a fan. The hill has a height of 15-20 meters and the site is located at the elevation of 28-55 meters above sea level.

See also
 Prehistory of Taiwan

References

1941 archaeological discoveries
Archaeological sites in Taiwan
Buildings and structures in Kaohsiung